Douglas C. Skene (born June 17, 1970) is a former American football player. He played college football as an offensive guard and offensive tackle for the University of Michigan from 1989 to 1992. He played professional football in the National Football League (NFL) for the New England Patriots from 1993 to 1994.

Early years
Skene was born in Ann Arbor, Michigan, in 1970. Moved to Texas in 1980. He attended Allen High School in Texas.

University of Michigan
Skene played college football for the University of Michigan from 1989 to 1992.  He played on the offensive line for Michigan and was coached there by Les Miles.  Skene later recalled: "The thing that Les hammered us on was the attention to detail.  I never went through more walk-throughs in my entire life and more meetings and detailed study of the opponents than with Les.  I felt he was really hard on me, and I told him later that at times I hated him. But looking back on it, he was the best coach of Xs and Os and the best technician I ever had."

Professional football

Skene was drafted by the Philadelphia Eagles in the eighth round (217th overall pick) of the 1993 NFL Draft.  He ended up with the New Orleans Saints and was put on waivers.  In November 1993, he was signed by the New England Patriots.  He started the first six games of the 1994 NFL season for the Patriots. In his first NFL game, Skene was credited with playing a key role in helping Drew Bledsoe pass for 421 yards to set a franchise record.  In an October 1994 game against the Los Angeles Raiders, Skene suffered a career-ending injury to his left knee.  He was making a block when 310-pound Chester McGlockton fell on the back of his knee.  Skene attempted a comeback in 1995, but he was waived by the Patriots in late August 1995.

References

1970 births
American football offensive guards
University of Michigan alumni
Michigan Wolverines football players
New England Patriots players
Players of American football from Texas
Sportspeople from the Dallas–Fort Worth metroplex
Living people
People from Allen, Texas